Jamie Blair Glover (born 10 July 1969) is an English actor. He is best known for being cast as Harry Potter in the second cast of the West-End production of Harry Potter and the Cursed Child in 2017. He portrayed Deputy Head Andrew Treneman in the BBC One school-based drama series, Waterloo Road, and starred as Roger Tramplemain in Michael Frayn's comical farce Noises Off at the Novello Theatre in 2012. He also appeared as William Russell in the Doctor Who docudrama, An Adventure in Space and Time (2013).

Background
Born and brought up in Barnes, London, Glover is the son of actors Julian Glover and Isla Blair. He attended Frensham Heights School in Farnham, Surrey, and trained at the Central School of Speech and Drama.

Glover has two daughters, Edie and Ava, with his partner, actress Sasha Behar. They currently live in Brixton, South London. During his time at the Central School of Speech and Drama, Glover met and shared a flat with fellow actor Philip Glenister.

Career

Television
Glover made his professional debut in the soap opera Jupiter Moon. His other television credits include Birds of a Feather, Casualty, Joseph, New Tricks, Midsomer Murders and Trial & Retribution XV: Rules Of The Game. He played deputy head Andrew Treneman in the first two series of the BBC One school-based drama Waterloo Road, alongside Jason Merrells and Angela Griffin, and briefly reprised the role in the fourth series.

Theatre and film
Glover made his first stage appearance at the age of eight, playing young Marcius in a production of Coriolanus at Stratford. Although other juvenile appearances and film offers followed, his parents kept him from becoming a child actor, preferring that he make the choice about his career when he was ready. His theatre work includes Edward III, Henry V (Propeller), The Chalk Garden, The Glass Menagerie, The Cherry Orchard and All's Well That Ends Well, alongside Judi Dench. He also appeared in Hamlet at the Norwich Playhouse, alongside his parents, with Julian Glover also directing the production.

He most recently played Peter in the French comedy What's In A Name? alongside Nigel Harman, Sarah Hadland, Raymond Coulthard and Olivia Poulet at the Birmingham Repertory Theatre in January 2017.

He joined the cast of Harry Potter and the Cursed Child at the Palace Theatre, London starting on 24 May 2017, playing the role of Harry Potter.

Glover has appeared in the films These Foolish Things, The Reef and Closing Numbers.

Voice work
Glover has lent his voice to documentaries, commercials, audiobooks and computer games. He joined the Star Wars universe in various voice-roles; he played General Maximilian Veers in Star Wars: Battlefront II, taking over the role from his father who played the same character in The Empire Strikes Back. In Battlefront II, he dubbed over archive footage of his father as Veers for the archive footage sequences in the game from Empire Strikes Back. He returned to reprise his role as Veers in Star Wars: Empire at War. He also did voice work in Knights of the Old Republic II, and has a major role in Star Wars: The Old Republic as Darth Malgus.

He also works in radio drama, and considers that: "Radio allows you to do work on a really good piece with a great cast, director and writer but because it takes far less time, it means that you can schedule in other things easily".

Directing
Glover directed student productions at RADA, and in 2008 made his directorial debut with a production of Measure for Measure for the Ambassador's Theatre Group.

Filmography

Television

Film

Video games

References

External links
 

People from Barnes, London
People educated at Frensham Heights School
Alumni of the Royal Central School of Speech and Drama
English people of Scottish descent
English male television actors
English male stage actors
English male film actors
English male voice actors
English male radio actors
English male Shakespearean actors
Male actors from London
Royal Shakespeare Company members
1969 births
Living people
20th-century English male actors
21st-century English male actors